Raduzhny is a town in Khanty-Mansi Autonomous Okrug, Russia, located on the Agan River,  northeast of Khanty-Mansiysk and  northeast of Tyumen. Population:  47,060 (2002 Census); 43,726 (1989 Census).

History
It was founded as a settlement in an oil-extracting area. It was granted town status in 1985.

Administrative and municipal status
Within the framework of administrative divisions, it is incorporated as the town of okrug significance of Raduzhny—an administrative unit with the status equal to that of the districts. As a municipal division, the town of okrug significance of Raduzhny is incorporated as Raduzhny Urban Okrug.

Economy
The town is served by the Raduzhny Airport. The economy is based on oil and natural gas extraction.

References

Notes

Sources

Cities and towns in Khanty-Mansi Autonomous Okrug